Cheaha State Park is a public recreation area located in Clay and Cleburne counties in Alabama, USA. The park's  include Cheaha Mountain, the highest point in the state. The park adjoins Talladega National Forest and is managed by the Alabama Department of Conservation and Natural Resources. It is Alabama's oldest continuously operating state park. Facilities include lodgings, a restaurant, campsites, and hiking trails.

History 
The park opened to the public in 1933. From 1933 to 1939, the Civilian Conservation Corps was active in the park creating Cheaha Lake and building numerous structures including a stone bathhouse, eleven stone cabins, two stone pavilions, Bunker Tower, the Bald Rock Group Lodge, and several hiking trails. A hotel, restaurant, and five chalets were added to the park in 1973.

In 2020, the park's Doug Ghee Accessible Trail was named a National Recreation Trail.

On January 4, 1944, a P-38 Lightning, piloted by 2nd Lieutenant Chester R. Gunkel of Milwaukee, Wisconsin, was flying from Love Field, Dallas, Texas to Atlanta, Georgia and crashed into Bald Rock. A machine gun was recovered from the crash site and was subsequently donated to the park museum in 2023.

Awards 
In September 2020, Cheaha State Park was one of eleven Alabama State Parks awarded Tripadvisor’s Traveler’s Choice Award, which recognizes businesses and attractions that earn consistently high user reviews.

Activities and amenities
Day-use: The park has day-use areas for picnicking, swimming, and fishing.
Scenic overlooks: Cheaha Mountain is topped with Bunker Tower, a stone building with an observation deck on top. A wheelchair-accessible wooden walkway on the Bald Rock Trail provides another overlook of the surrounding region.
Hiking: The park features the Cheaha Trailhead of the Pinhoti Trail system which weaves through the Talladega National Forest and connects to the Appalachian Trail.
Overnight stays: The park has 73 modern campsites and a smaller number of semi-primitive campsites. Accommodations also include a 30-room hotel, chalets, and cabins. The Bald Rock Group Lodge is used for conferences and weddings.

See also 
Cheaha Wilderness

References

External links

Cheaha State Park Alabama Department of Conservation and Natural Resources

State parks of Alabama
State parks of the Appalachians
Protected areas of Clay County, Alabama
Protected areas of Cleburne County, Alabama
Civilian Conservation Corps in Alabama
Protected areas established in 1933
1933 establishments in Alabama
Mountain biking venues in Alabama
National Recreation Trails in Alabama
Alabama placenames of Native American origin